Rosculus is a heterolobosean amoeboid genus.

References

Percolozoa
Excavata genera